Long Beach is a census-designated place and unincorporated community in Calvert County, Maryland, United States. Its population was 1,821 as of the 2010 census. Prior to 2010, the community was part of the Calvert Beach-Long Beach CDP.

Demographics

References

Census-designated places in Calvert County, Maryland
Census-designated places in Maryland
Maryland populated places on the Chesapeake Bay